Damian Young (born October 27, 1961) is an American actor notable for his appearance in the Hal Hartley film Amateur (1994). He also featured in Hartley's earlier film Simple Men (1992), and has appeared in theatre, television and film. He played bus driver Stu Benedict for three seasons in The Adventures of Pete & Pete (1993–96), Mark Berman in the HBO series The Comeback, Bill Lewis on Californication, Aidan Macallan on House of Cards, and Gabriel in the 2014 film Birdman or (The Unexpected Virtue of Ignorance). Young played Jim Rattelsdorf for three seasons on the Netflix series Ozark, starring Jason Bateman and Laura Linney.

Young performed in productions with Allison Janney at Kenyon College.

Filmography

References

External links
 

Living people
American male film actors
American male television actors
Place of birth missing (living people)
21st-century American male actors
1961 births